Happier? is the fourth studio album by American progressive metalcore band Volumes. It was released on November 19, 2021 through Fearless Records. The album was produced by Raad Soudani, Daniel Braunstein and Max Schad.

On June 17, 2022, the band released their third EP entitled Bend(ed), featuring two different takes of the song "Bend" from Happier?. Among them are a stripped down version and a live rendition, in addition to the original studio version of the song.

Background and recording
On July 16, 2019, Volumes announced that they are working on new material for the forthcoming album. On February 12, 2021, the band have concluded the recording sessions for their new album. On April 14, the group announced that the album is in mixing process.

On May 6, Volumes completely wrapped their studio work on the record. On October 8, they revealed the album itself, the album cover, the track list, and release date.

Critical reception

The album received positive reviews from critics. Dan McHugh of Distorted Sound scored the album 9 out of 10 and said: "The level of consistency and quality held inside Happier? is pretty remarkable considering the sheer level of turmoil that Volumes have had to endure to get to this stage. As the old cliché adequately states 'anything worth having is worth fighting for' and it has certainly brought the best out of this group of musicians. If you were ever in any doubt concerning the longevity of the band then hopefully this release will assist in revitalising your hope for a fruitful future."

Kerrang! gave the album 3 out of 5 and stated: "All in all, it's an album that gives a nod to the band's past while still bringing in new ideas. And will that make fans Happier? Almost certainly…" Wall of Sound gave the album a score 8/10 and saying: "So here comes the big admission, before I took this review on – I'd not actually heard of Volumes. I make this admission embarrassingly too often but it's fun discovering so much great new music. I am so glad I reviewed this album though, I can already tell that 'Get Enough' is my new hyper-fixation-play-all-the-time song. I also like the versatility and obvious talent of this band. Both vocalists effortlessly switch between both the cleans and screams. The instrumentation is fantastic, supports the songs' themes so well, and sounds so cohesive and polished. I know this band has been through a bit of a tumultuous time with in-fighting, line-up changes and tragedy, but from my new-to-the-band point-of-view – they sound like a band hitting their stride. This album is excellent and spoiler alert: it will be in my top albums of the year."

Track listing
Adapted from Apple Music.

Personnel
Credits adapted from Discogs.

Volumes
 Myke Terry – lead vocals
 Michael Barr – co-lead vocals, vocal production
 Raad Soudani – bass, programming, production, recording
 Nick Ursich – drums

Additional musicians
 Daniel Braunstein – guitars, production, mixing, mastering, recording
 Max Schad – guitars, programming, production, recording

Additional personnel
 Marc Mutnansky – project management
 Derek Brewer – management
 Cody Demavivas – A&R
 Gabor Toth – artwork
 Sage LaMonica – design
 Levi Seitz – lacquer cut

References

2021 albums
Fearless Records albums
Volumes (band) albums